Naeem Hashmi (died 27 April 1976) was a Pakistani film, television and stage actor, writer, poet, producer, and director. He was known for his roles as a villain in the late 1940s and 1950s, but he later took character roles in over 100 films.

Career
Naeem Hashmi first made his film debut in British India in the film Chandani Chowk (1946). His first movie in Pakistan was Ilzam (1953). His naats, or lyrics and praises said for the Islamic prophet Muhammad, also earned him much fame. The peak of his professional career came when he wrote the Naat Shah-E-Madina, Yasreb Ke Waali sung by Saleem Raza and Zubaida Khanum for the Pakistani film Noor-E-Islam (1957). It became a run-away super-hit song in 1957, and still has cultural relevance to this day.

Many of his films, such as the banned Inqalab-e-Kashmir, addressed social and national Pakistani issues.  Ziddi (1973 film), Sharif Badmash (1975 film), Chitra Tay Shera (1976 film) were some of Naeem Hashmi's most successful films during his career.

Death and legacy
Naeem Hashmi died of complications arising from his diabetes on 27 April 1976. 

Naeem Hashmi's eldest son, Khawar Naeem Hashmi, now serves as a Pakistani journalist, working with BOL TV as its bureau chief in Lahore, Pakistan. He served for 35 years in Jang Group of Newspapers, as a news reporter for Geo News channel, and served as Bureau Chief of Geo News in Lahore, Pakistan.

Filmography

In India
 Chandni Chowk (1946)

In Pakistan
Ilzam (1953)
Khatoon (1955)
Chhoti Begum (1956)
Nigar (1957)
Noor-e-Islam (1957)
Shama (1959)
Jhoomer (1959) 
Ayaz (1960)
Azmat-e-Islam (1965)
Madar-e-Millat (1966)
Diya Aur Toofan (1969 film)
 Behan Bhai (1968)
Babul (1971)
Nizam (1972)
Ziddi (1973 film)
Sharif Badmash (1975 film)
Chitra Tay Shera (1976 film)

See also 
 List of Lollywood actors

References

External links
 

Year of birth missing
1976 deaths
Pakistani male film actors
Pakistani performers of Islamic music
Urdu-language poets from Pakistan
Pakistani lyricists
Pakistani songwriters